Liam Tallon is a former rugby league . Tallon was an Ireland international and played at the 2000 Rugby League World Cup, replacing Gary Connolly who missed the call due to injury. Prior to being called up by Ireland, Tallon had been playing with the Brisbane Norths in Queensland.

Background
Tallon was born in Australia.

References

External links
The Teams: Ireland

1976 births
Living people
Australian rugby league players
Australian emigrants to Ireland
Dewsbury Rams players
Irish people of Australian descent
Ireland national rugby league team players
Norths Devils players